Lloyd "Pete" F. Weeks (June 9, 1932October 25, 2002) was an American politician from Michigan. Weeks was a Democratic member of Michigan House of Representatives.

Early life 
Weeks was born on June 9, 1932, in Cheboygan, Michigan.

Career 
Weeks' first elected position was to the Member Warren City Council where he served from 1977 to 1982. Weeks was first sworn in to the Michigan House of Representatives from the 70th district from 1983 to 1992. He then represented the 28th district from 1993 to 1996.

Personal life 
Weeks married Tracy and together they had nine children. Weeks was Presbyterian.
Weeks died on October 25, 2002.

References 

1932 births
2002 deaths
Michigan city council members
Presbyterians from Michigan
20th-century Presbyterians
Wayne State University alumni
Macomb Community College alumni
Democratic Party members of the Michigan House of Representatives
21st-century American politicians
20th-century American politicians